The Hudson Bay toad (Anaxyrus americanus copei) is a rare subspecies of the American toad. As suggested by its name, it is found in the Hudson Bay region in Ontario and Quebec, Canada. However, the status of Anaxyrus americanus subspecies is unclear, and Anaxyrus americanus copei is not listed in the 2012 edition of the "Scientific and Standard English Names of Amphibians and Reptiles of North America North of Mexico".

References

americanus copei
Amphibians of Canada
Endemic fauna of Canada
Taxa named by Henry Crécy Yarrow